Jeffrey Orlis "Jeff" Hanson (February 9, 1958 – November 17, 2006) was an American politician.

Early life and education
Born in Milwaukee, Wisconsin, Hanson received his bachelor's degree in mass communication from Moorhead State University and his master's degree from University of Minnesota.

Career
He lived in Woodbury, Minnesota and was the Washington County, Minnesota Public Information Officer. From 1991 to 1993, Hanson served in the Minnesota House of Representatives and was a Democrat. Hanson then served as executor director of the Minnesota Utility Contractors Association from 1994 until his death. Hanson died of Creutzfeldt–Jakob disease in a hospital in Woodbury, Minnesota.

Notes

1958 births
2006 deaths
Politicians from Milwaukee
People from Woodbury, Minnesota
Minnesota State University Moorhead alumni
University of Minnesota alumni
Democratic Party members of the Minnesota House of Representatives
Neurological disease deaths in Minnesota
Deaths from Creutzfeldt–Jakob disease
20th-century American politicians